Lyford Cay is a private gated community located on the western tip of New Providence island in The Bahamas. The former cay that lent its name to the community is named after Captain William Lyford Jr., a mariner of note in Colonial and Revolutionary times, and is built on a 448-acre (181 ha) grant he received for his services as a Loyalist in the American Revolutionary War. Captain Lyford also received a 92-acre (37 ha) grant on Cat Island, Bahamas for playing a key role in Andrew Deveaux’s raid of April 1783 that drove the Spanish from Nassau.

Cay
Lyford Cay, also called Simms Cay, was a cay a few hundred metres off the north west coast of New Providence Island, 1.4 km long east-west, and up to 200 metres wide. On the map in the 1901 Edward Stanford Atlas it is noted: "The Isthmus at Lyford Cay has grown since 1830, when boats could pass at H.W. It is now 10 fṭ high & covered with bushes."

Character
Considered one of the world's wealthiest and most exclusive neighbourhoods, the Lyford Cay Club was built during the latter part of the 1950s by prominent Canadian businessman Edward Plunkett Taylor, who bought the land in 1954 from Bahamian developer Sir Harold Christie. In December 1962, U.S. President John F. Kennedy stayed at E. P. Taylor's home in Lyford Cay while he held talks with British Prime Minister Harold Macmillan. There are about 450 homes.

Notable residents 
 The Bacardi family
 Louis Bacon, U.S. hedge fund manager
 The German-Dutch Brenninkmeijer family
 R. Couri Hay, a Couristan carpet heir and the society editor of Palm Beach magazine and Hamptons magazine
 Viktor Kožený, Czech fugitive financier
 Joe Lewis, British businessman

Former residents 
 Sean Connery, British actor, Connery died at Lyford Cay in 2020
 Henry Ford II, son of Edsel Ford, grandson of Henry Ford, former president of the Ford Motor Company
 Prince Azamat Guirey, of the ruling family of Crimea
 Stavros Niarchos, Greek shipping magnate
 Peter Nygård, Finnish-Canadian former fashion executive
 Sir Tony O'Reilly, Irish media tycoon
 Sir John Templeton, American-born British investor and philanthropist
 Arthur Hailey, British-Canadian novelist, author of The Lyford legacy: a history of Lyford Cay from 1788

References

External links 
 

1950s establishments in the Bahamas
Gated communities
Golf clubs and courses in the Bahamas
New Providence
Peter Nygård
Populated places in the Bahamas
Resorts in the Bahamas